Hypogymnia irregularis is a species of corticolous (bark-dwelling) and lignicolous (wood-dwelling), foliose lichen in the family Parmeliaceae. Found in Asia, it was formally described as a new species in 2011 by lichenologist Bruce McCune. It has since been recorded growing on the wood and bark of both conifers (including Picea, Pinus, Tsuga) and hardwood trees (including Rhododendron, Quercus, Sorbus, and dwarf bamboo). In addition to southwest China (Yunnan and Sichuan), where it is most common, it has also been collected from India, Nepal, Tibet, and Taiwan. The species epithet alludes to the irregular positioning of perforations on the lower surface of the thallus.

References

Parmeliaceae
Lichen species
Lichens described in 2011
Lichens of China
Lichens of the Indian subcontinent
Lichens of Eastern Asia
Taxa named by Bruce McCune